Michael Matthews, born August 28, 1950 in Gander, Newfoundland, is a composer and photographer. Matthews completed a Ph.D. in composition at North Texas State University in 1985. Matthews is a Fellow of the Royal Society of Canada and works in Berlin.

Matthews' abstract photographs have been exhibited in Germany and the US. Canadian publisher At Bay Press has recently published Gibbous Moon, a book of photography and poetry created in collaboration with poet Dennis Cooley.

Early life
Michael Matthews was born in Gander, Newfoundland in 1950. At that time his father John Matthews was working for KLM Royal Dutch Airlines as a ground operations manager. Matthews was still an infant when his family moved to Miami, Florida, where his father took a job with Pan Am. Growing up, Matthews lived in Miami, Kingston, Jamaica, Managua Nicauragua, Port of Spain and Piarco, Trinidad, and Karachi, Pakistan, where he attended and graduated from the Karachi American School (KAS). A year at Purdue University studying aeronautical engineering followed, and then a move to Los Angeles, where he changed his focus to music. After earning his Ph.D. in composition and conduction, Matthews took a nine-month teaching appointment in Winnipeg at the University of Manitoba. This was followed by two years of teaching at Mokwon University in Taejon, Korea, and then a return to Canada to take up a tenure-track faculty position as head of the Composition Department at the University of Manitoba School of Music (currently the Desautels Faculty of Music).

Education
His composition teachers included Larry Austin at the University of North Texas College of Music (formerly North Texas State University), Ben Glovinsky at California State University Sacramento and Aurelio de la Vega at California State University Northridge.

Career
From 1985-2012, Matthews was head of the composition department at the Marcel A. Desautels Faculty of Music at the University of Manitoba in Winnipeg; he is now a Professor Emeritus there.  Matthews is a conductor and a founder and artistic director of the GroundSwell new music series in Winnipeg.

From 2002-2004 he was Composer-in-Residence with the Saskatoon Symphony Orchestra.

Matthews is a member of the Canadian Electroacoustic Community, member of the Canadian League of Composers and an Associate Composer of the Canadian Music Centre.

Works
 it is raining gently with light for cl/b.cl.vn.pf. Commissioned by GroundSwell and Madeline Hildebrand (2021)
 till our bodies into the night slip for cl/b.cl.vc.pf. Commissioned by SOLI Chamber Ensemble (2020)
 perishable light for viola/viola d'amore and percussion. Commissioned by Park Sounds (2019)
 Septet for fl.ob.cl/b.cl.sax.vn.vc.pf. Commissioned by ensemble mosaik (2016)
 Sólo queda el desierto for soprano and chamber orchestra. Commissioned by the Montreal Chamber Orchestra (2014)
 and the sky caught for clarinet (bass clarinet), viola and piano (2012)
 String Quartet No. 4 Commissioned by the Penderecki Quartet (2011) 
 Six Poems of Novic Tadić for Mezzo Soprano and Chamber Orchestra (2008)
 El Viento Helado for Woodwind Quintet (2007)
 De Reflejo a Fulgor for Piano and Tape (2007)
 Einklang for two Pianos (2007)
 Night Music for Violin and Piano (2007)
 The Language of Water for String Orchestra (2006)
 The Skin of Night for Saxophone and Piano (2006)
 3 Duos (Book I) for violin and viola (2005)
 String Quartet No. 3 (2005)
 Symphony No. 3 (2005)
 Prince Kaspar Chamber Opera based on a libretto by Per Brask (2005)
 Piano Quartet (2004)
 Away, Tear Away for Woodwind Quintet and Tape (2003)
 Las Blancas Sombras for Voice and Guitar (2003)
 String Quartet No. 2 (2003)
 Particles of One for Violin and Chamber Orchestra (2002)
 Prelude to Macbeth for Orchestra (2002)
 Hommage à György Kurtág for 2 Violins and 2 Celli (2002)
 Song Fragments for Cello and Piano (2002)
 Symphony No. 2 (2001)
 On the Outer Edge for Tape (2001)
 Vertical Garden for Flute and Tape (2001)
 Wondering for viola solo (2001)
 Concerto for Cello (2001)
 Miniatures for String Quartet (2000)
 Fantasy/Nocturne for Piano (1999)
 String Quartet No. 1 (1999)
 . . . of the rolling worlds for Bass Clarinet and Tape (1999)
 Ernst Toller: Requiem for an Idea for Cello and Actor (1999)
 Partita — Images/Fragments for Violin and Piano (1999)
 Into the Page of Night for Orchestra (1998)
 Concerto for Piano (1998)
 Lorca Sketches for String Orchestra (1997)
 Postlude for Piano (1997)
 Symphony No. 1 (1997)
 Two Interludes for Orchestra (1996)
 Deux chansons d'amour for Voice and Piano (1996)
 Night Prairie for SATB Choir (1995)
 In Emptiness, Over Emptiness for Soprano and Tape (1994)
 Two Night Pieces for four Male Voices (1994)
 Layerings for Vibraphone and Tape (1993)
 Scattered Mirrors for Piano (1993)
 Out of the Earth for Soprano and Chamber Ensemble (1993)
 Between the Wings of the Earth for Chamber Orchestra (1993)
 Rooms of Light for SATB Choir (1992)
 Four Songs of Japan for soprano, viola and fortepiano (1991)
 Landscape for Piano and String Orchestra (1990)
 Of Time and Sky for Piano (1990)
 The First Sea for Bass Clarinet and Tape (1989)
 Wind Sketches for Wind Octet (1988)
 The Far Field for Orchestra (1987)
 Fantasy for Violin (1985)

Recordings
String Quartets Nos. 2 and 3, Miniatures. Clearwater String Quartet, Ravello Records 7910, 2015.

Bibliography
Carrabré, Pat. "Sounding Language: The Music of Michael Matthews", Border Crossings Vol.7, No.2, "The Royal Winnipeg Ballet" (#26), April 1988, pp.42-43.

Kuhn, Laura, "Michael Matthews", Baker's Biographical Dictionary of Twentieth-Century Classical Musicians Nicolas Slonimsky, author, Laura Kuhn and Dennis McIntire, eds. New York: Schirmer Books, 1997. 

MacMillan, Rick. “Michael Matthews”, Encyclopedia of Music in Canada, 2nd ed. Ed. Helmut Kallmann and Gilles Potvin. Toronto: University of Toronto Press, 1992.

References

External links 
 Michael Matthews' Photography Website
 Michael Matthews in The Canadian Encyclopedia
 Michael Matthews in Encyclopedia.com
 Michael Matthews at Desautels Faculty of Music
 Michael Matthews at Ravello Records
 Canadian Electroacoustic Community Membership
 Michael Matthews at Glasstire – Texas Visual Art

1950 births
Living people
Canadian composers
Canadian male composers
Academic staff of the University of Manitoba